Ha Chi Chun (夏志珍) is a Hong Kong actress.

Filmography 
 Passionate Nights (1997) - Sister Cheuk
 Come from China (1992) - Female Robber
 Fist of Fury 1991 (1991) - Flutty Ping
 Jail House Eros (1990) - The Ghost
 Final Run (1989) - Jensy
 Carry on Yakuza!! (1989) - Female Yakuza
 Widow Warriors (1989) - Female Triad in Health Club
 Angel Enforcers (1989) - Female Crime Boss
 Aces Go Places V: The Terracotta Hit (1989) - Female Communist Agent #1
 Women's Prison (1988) - Guard
 Erotic Ghost Story (1987) - Mrs. Wang
 Eastern Condors (1986) - Guerrilla Girl #3

External links 
 
 HK Cinemagic entry

Living people
20th-century Hong Kong actresses
Year of birth missing (living people)